The 2003 Prime Minister's Cup  was an international friendly soccer tournament . Matches were held from 12 – 18 December 2003 in Manama.

Participants

Standings

Matches

References 

2003–04 in Bahraini football
December 2003 sports events in Asia
2003